Katie Pratt is an artist and abstract painter living and working in London. Born in Epsom, UK, 23 May 1969, she is most recognised for large paintings with heavy volumes of oil paint that combine geometric and organic detail in diagrammatic complex systems. She won the Jerwood Painting Prize in 2001.

Education 

MA (RCA) Painting Royal College of Art 1996–1998
BA (Hons) Fine Art (Painting) Winchester School of Art 1989–1992
Foundation in Art & Design at Central School of Art & Design 1987–1988
Wallington High School for Girls 1985–1987
St Helen's School 1980–1985

Exhibitions 

2017 The Order of Things Co-curator (with Andrew Bick and Jonathan Parsons) and Exhibitor, 28 January 2017– 2 March 2017 at The Wilson (Cheltenham)
2016 Upsom Downs Galerie Peter Zimmermann Mannheim, Germany
2015 Revisiting the Jerwood Painting Prize Jerwood Gallery, Hastings
2006 Jonathan Lasker, Patrick Heron, Katie PrattJohn Hansard Gallery, University of Southampton curated by Prof. Stephen Foster 14 February to 8 April 2006
2005 Landscape Confection, curated by Helen Molesworth Wexner Center for the Arts 29 January −1 May 2005 Contemporary Arts Museum Houston 23 July – 11 September 2005 & Orange County Museum of Art 6 February- 7 May 2006
2003 New British Painting: Part 1 John Hansard Gallery, University of Southampton 2 December 2003 – 31 January 2004
1999 New Contemporaries99

Further reading

 Katie Pratt 2016 Jonathan Lasker & Katie Pratt in Conversation Turps Banana Magazine No. 16 Spring 2016 
 Taylor, Brandon 2013 Geometry After Utopia in Utopian Reality ed. Lodder, C, Kokkori, M & Mileeva, M published in Amsterdam by Brill Publishers 
 Lee, R. 2004 Threads in Unframed (ed. Betterton, R.) published in New York by I.B. Tauris

References

1969 births
Living people
20th-century English women artists
21st-century English women artists
Alumni of the Royal College of Art
Abstract painters
English women painters
Painters from London
People educated at Wallington High School for Girls
People from Epsom
People from Southwark